Raytown C-2 School District, doing business as "Raytown Quality Schools" (RQS), is a school district headquartered in Raytown, Missouri in the Kansas City metropolitan area. It serves all of Raytown, portions of eastern Kansas City and southeastern Independence.

Schools

High schools 

 Raytown Senior High School
 Raytown South High School
 Herndon Career Center

Middle schools 

 Central Middle School
 Raytown Middle School
 South Middle School

Elementary schools 

 Blue Ridge Elementary School
 Eastwood Hills Elementary School
 Fleetridge Elementary School
 Laurel Hills Elementary School
 Little Blue Elementary School
 Norfleet Elementary School
 Robinson Elementary School
 Southwood Elementary School
 Spring Valley Elementary School
 Westridge Elementary School

Early childhood 

 New Trails Early Learning Center
 Three Trails Preschool

References

External links
 

School districts in Missouri
Education in Jackson County, Missouri
Education in Kansas City, Missouri
Independence, Missouri